Parallax is a displacement or difference in the apparent position of an object viewed along two different lines of sight and is measured by the angle or half-angle of inclination between those two lines. Due to foreshortening, nearby objects show a larger parallax than farther objects, so parallax can be used to determine distances.

To measure large distances, such as the distance of a planet or a star from Earth, astronomers use the principle of parallax. Here, the term parallax is the semi-angle of inclination between two sight-lines to the star, as observed when Earth is on opposite sides of the Sun in its orbit. These distances form the lowest rung of what is called "the cosmic distance ladder", the first in a succession of methods by which astronomers determine the distances to celestial objects, serving as a basis for other distance measurements in astronomy forming the higher rungs of the ladder.

Parallax also affects optical instruments such as rifle scopes, binoculars, microscopes, and twin-lens reflex cameras that view objects from slightly different angles. Many animals, along with humans, have two eyes with overlapping visual fields that use parallax to gain depth perception; this process is known as stereopsis. In computer vision the effect is used for computer stereo vision, and there is a device called a parallax rangefinder that uses it to find the range, and in some variations also altitude to a target.

A simple everyday example of parallax can be seen in the dashboards of motor vehicles that use a needle-style mechanical speedometer. When viewed from directly in front, the speed may show exactly 60, but when viewed from the passenger seat, the needle may appear to show a slightly different speed due to the angle of viewing combined with the displacement of the needle from the plane of the numerical dial.

Visual perception 

As the eyes of humans and other animals are in different positions on the head, they present different views simultaneously. This is the basis of stereopsis, the process by which the brain exploits the parallax due to the different views from the eye to gain depth perception and estimate distances to objects. 

Animals also use motion parallax, in which the animals (or just the head) move to gain different viewpoints. For example, pigeons (whose eyes do not have overlapping fields of view and thus cannot use stereopsis) bob their heads up and down to see depth.
The motion parallax is exploited also in wiggle stereoscopy, computer graphics that provide depth cues through viewpoint-shifting animation rather than through binocular vision.

Distance measurement 
Parallax arises due to a change in viewpoint occurring due to the motion of the observer, of the observed, or both. What is essential is relative motion. By observing parallax, measuring angles, and using geometry, one can determine distance.

Distance measurement by parallax is a special case of the principle of triangulation, which states that one can solve for all the sides and angles in a network of triangles if, in addition to all the angles in the network, the length of at least one side has been measured. Thus, the careful measurement of the length of one baseline can fix the scale of an entire triangulation network. In parallax, the triangle is extremely long and narrow, and by measuring both its shortest side (the motion of the observer) and the small top angle (always less than 1 arcsecond, leaving the other two close to 90  degrees), the length of the long sides (in practice considered to be equal) can be determined.

In astronomy, assuming the angle is small, the distance to a star (measured in parsecs) is the reciprocal of the parallax (measured in arcseconds):  For example, the distance to Proxima Centauri is 1/0.7687 = .

On Earth, a coincidence rangefinder or parallax rangefinder can be used to find distance to a target.
In surveying, the problem of resection explores angular measurements from a known baseline for determining an unknown point's coordinates.

Astronomy

Metrology 

Measurements made by viewing the position of some marker relative to something to be measured are subject to parallax error if the marker is some distance away from the object of measurement and not viewed from the correct position. For example, if measuring the distance between two ticks on a line with a ruler marked on its top surface, the thickness of the ruler will separate its markings from the ticks. If viewed from a position not exactly perpendicular to the ruler, the apparent position will shift and the reading will be less accurate than the ruler is capable of.

A similar error occurs when reading the position of a pointer against a scale in an instrument such as an analog multimeter. To help the user avoid this problem, the scale is sometimes printed above a narrow strip of mirror, and the user's eye is positioned so that the pointer obscures its reflection, guaranteeing that the user's line of sight is perpendicular to the mirror and therefore to the scale. The same effect alters the speed read on a car's speedometer by a driver in front of it and a passenger off to the side, values read from a graticule, not in actual contact with the display on an oscilloscope, etc.

Photogrammetry 

When viewed through a stereo viewer, aerial picture pair offers a pronounced stereo effect of landscape and buildings. High buildings appear to "keel over" in the direction away from the center of the photograph. Measurements of this parallax are used to deduce the height of the buildings, provided that flying height and baseline distances are known. This is a key component of the process of photogrammetry.

Photography 

Parallax error can be seen when taking photos with many types of cameras, such as twin-lens reflex cameras and those including viewfinders (such as rangefinder cameras). In such cameras, the eye sees the subject through different optics (the viewfinder, or a second lens) than the one through which the photo is taken. As the viewfinder is often found above the lens of the camera, photos with parallax error are often slightly lower than intended, the classic example being the image of a person with their head cropped off. This problem is addressed in single-lens reflex cameras, in which the viewfinder sees through the same lens through which the photo is taken (with the aid of a movable mirror), thus avoiding parallax error.

Parallax is also an issue in image stitching, such as for panoramas.

Weapon sights
Parallax affects sighting devices of ranged weapons in many ways. On sights fitted on small arms and bows, etc., the perpendicular distance between the sight and the weapon's launch axis (e.g. the bore axis of a gun)—generally referred to as "sight height"—can induce significant aiming errors when shooting at close range, particularly when shooting at small targets. This parallax error is compensated for (when needed) via calculations that also take in other variables such as bullet drop, windage, and the distance at which the target is expected to be. Sight height can be used to advantage when "sighting in" rifles for field use. A typical hunting rifle (.222 with telescopic sights) sighted in at 75m will still be useful from  without needing further adjustment.

Optical sights

In some reticled optical instruments such as telescopes, microscopes or in telescopic sights ("scopes") used on small arms and theodolites, parallax can create problems when the reticle is not coincident with the focal plane of the target image. This is because when the reticle and the target are not at the same focus, the optically corresponded distances being projected through the eyepiece are also different, and the user's eye will register the difference in parallaxes between the reticle and the target (whenever eye position changes) as a relative displacement on top of each other. The term parallax shift refers to the resultant apparent "floating" movements of the reticle over the target image when the user moves his/her head/eye laterally (up/down or left/right) behind the sight, i.e. an error where the reticle does not stay aligned with the user's optical axis.

Some firearm scopes are equipped with a parallax compensation mechanism, which consists of a movable optical element that enables the optical system to shift the focus of the target image at varying distances into the same optical plane of the reticle (or vice versa). Many low-tier telescopic sights may have no parallax compensation because in practice they can still perform very acceptably without eliminating parallax shift. In this case, the scope is often set fixed at a designated parallax-free distance that best suits their intended usage. Typical standard factory parallax-free distances for hunting scopes are 100  yd (or 90 m) to make them suited for hunting shots that rarely exceed 300  yd/m. Some competition and military-style scopes without parallax compensation may be adjusted to be parallax free at ranges up to 300  yd/m to make them better suited for aiming at longer ranges.

Non-magnifying reflector or "reflex" sights can be theoretically "parallax free." But since these sights use parallel collimated light this is only true when the target is at infinity. At finite distances, eye movement perpendicular to the device will cause parallax movement in the reticle image in exact relationship to the eye position in the cylindrical column of light created by the collimating optics. Firearm sights, such as some red dot sights, try to correct for this via not focusing the reticle at infinity, but instead at some finite distance, a designed target range where the reticle will show very little movement due to parallax. Some manufacturers market reflector sight models they call "parallax free," but this refers to an optical system that compensates for off axis spherical aberration, an optical error induced by the spherical mirror used in the sight that can cause the reticle position to diverge off the sight's optical axis with change in eye position.

Artillery gunfire 
Because of the positioning of field or naval artillery guns, each one has a slightly different perspective of the target relative to the location of the fire-control system itself. Therefore, when aiming its guns at the target, the fire control system must compensate for parallax in order to assure that fire from each gun converges on the target.

Art 

Several of Mark Renn's sculptural works play with parallax, appearing abstract until viewed from a specific angle. One such sculpture is The Darwin Gate (pictured) in Shrewsbury, England, which from a certain angle appears to form a dome, according to Historic England, in "the form of a Saxon helmet with a Norman window... inspired by features of St Mary's Church which was attended by Charles Darwin as a boy".

As a metaphor 
In a philosophic/geometric sense: an apparent change in the direction of an object, caused by a change in observational position that provides a new line of sight. The apparent displacement, or difference of position, of an object, as seen from two different stations, or points of view. In contemporary writing, parallax can also be the same story, or a similar story from approximately the same timeline, from one book, told from a different perspective in another book. The word and concept feature prominently in James Joyce's 1922 novel, Ulysses. Orson Scott Card also used the term when referring to Ender's Shadow as compared to Ender's Game.

The metaphor is invoked by Slovenian philosopher Slavoj Žižek in his 2006 book The Parallax View, borrowing the concept of "parallax view" from the Japanese philosopher and literary critic Kojin Karatani. Žižek notes,

See also
 Binocular disparity
 Lutz–Kelker bias
 Parallax mapping, in computer graphics
 Parallax scrolling, in computer graphics
 Refraction, a visually similar principle caused by water, etc.
 Spectroscopic parallax
 Triangulation, wherein a point is calculated given its angles from other known points
 Trigonometry
 True range multilateration, wherein a point is calculated given its distances from other known points
 Xallarap

Notes

References

Bibliography 

 
 .
 .

External links 
 Instructions for having background images on a web page use parallax effects
 Actual parallax project measuring the distance to the moon within 2.3%
 BBC's Sky at Night program: Patrick Moore demonstrates Parallax using Cricket. (Requires RealPlayer)
 Berkeley Center for Cosmological Physics Parallax
 Parallax on an educational website, including a quick estimate of distance based on parallax using eyes and a thumb only
 

 
Optics
Vision
Angle
Astrometry
Geometry in computer vision
Trigonometry